Bradley William Battin (born 12 December 1975) is an Australian politician who currently serves as the Liberal Party member for Berwick in the Victorian Legislative Assembly since 2022. he was previously the member for Gembrook from 2010 until the seat was abolished in 2022 following the 2021 Redistribution.  He was formerly a police officer and owned a bakery in Wheelers Hill.

Career 
Battin obtained a Diploma in Public Safety (Policing) with the Victoria Police, and a Graduate Diploma in Adolescent Health and Welfare from the University of Melbourne. In 2020 Battin completed a Graduate Certificate in Business. He has spoken on the issue of youth suicide on various occasions and targets raising further awareness about this.

Battin was promoted to Shadow Cabinet in 2014 as the Shadow Minister for Emergency Services and Environment. In 2017, he was appointed the first Victorian Shadow Minister for the Building Industry while still retaining the Emergency Services portfolio.

In 2020, Battin moved to Shadow Minister for Youth Justice, Shadow Minister for Crime Prevention, Shadow Minister for Victim Support, Shadow Minister for Roads (Metro), Shadow Minister for Road Safety and the TAC.

In March 2021, Battin attempted to oust Michael O'Brien as leader of the state Liberal Party, but was defeated in a 22–9 vote, following which he resigned from his shadow ministry positions.

After the Liberal Party lost the 2022 state election, Battin ran in the subsequent Liberal Party state leadership election after previous leader Matthew Guy resigned. He was endorsed by two of his former election challengers Ryan Smith and Richard Riordan, but lost the vote 17–16 to John Pesutto, the member for Hawthorn.

References

External links

1975 births
Living people
Members of the Victorian Legislative Assembly
Liberal Party of Australia members of the Parliament of Victoria
University of Melbourne alumni
Australian police officers
21st-century Australian politicians